Landysh Ilsurovna Falyakhova (born 31 August 1998) is a Russian ice hockey player and member of the Russian national ice hockey team, currently serving as an alternate captain of SKIF Nizhny Novgorod in the Zhenskaya Hockey League (ZhHL).

Falyakhova represented the Russian Olympic Committee at the 2021 IIHF Women's World Championship. She won a gold medal with the Russian team in the women's ice hockey tournament at the 2019 Winter Universiade. As a junior player with the Russian national under-18 team, she participated in the IIHF Women's U18 World Championship tournaments in 2015 and 2016, winning a bronze medal in 2015.

Falyakhova made her senior club debut with the secondary team of SKIF Nizhny Novgorod in the 2013–14 Russian Women's Hockey League season and has played the entirety of her career with the club. She was selected to the ZhHL All-Star Games in 2019, 2020, and 2022.

References

External links 
 

Living people
1998 births
People from Tatarstan
Russian women's ice hockey forwards
HC SKIF players
Universiade gold medalists for Russia
Universiade medalists in ice hockey
Competitors at the 2019 Winter Universiade
Ice hockey players at the 2022 Winter Olympics
Olympic ice hockey players of Russia
Sportspeople from Tatarstan